Marko Ćalasan (Macedonian: Марко Чаласан) (born 24 July 2000) is a Macedonian computer systems prodigy. He is noted for being the youngest Microsoft Certified Systems Administrator at the age of eight and the youngest certified computer systems engineer at the age of nine.

Biography
Marko Ćalasan was born in Skopje, Republic of Macedonia. He first made headlines in the United States in May 2010 when CNN's i-List did a story on him. He is from the city of Skopje, Macedonia. Marko currently holds 12 Microsoft certificates and 1 Cisco certificate: MCP, MCDST, MCSA, MCSE, MCTS, MCITP: Server Administrator, MCITP: Enterprise Administrator, CCENT...

 He received his first certificate at the age of 6. He is the youngest person to ever receive the MCSA certificate, Microsoft Certified Systems Administrator which he received at the age of eight. Beating the record set by M Lavinashree, who received her MCSA certificate at the age nine; and Micah Berkley, who received his at age 13.

Marko then went on to studying for the MCSE exam and was also the youngest person to receive the Microsoft Certified Systems Engineer Certificate as well. He teaches computer basics to children eight to eleven in his former elementary school. In addition to being skilled with computers Marko is fluent in three languages and is working on his fourth. The Macedonian government has reached out to help give Marko some assistance in furthering his potential. Nikola Gruevski, the former prime minister of Macedonia gave him an IT lab to help him further his learning.

He wrote a book for the pre-installation, installation and post-installation process of Windows 7. The book consists of 305 pages. The Ministry of Education in Macedonia has bought the rights for the book and now it will give it to the schools for free.

He has Montenegrin Serb roots.

Early childhood
Marko displayed excellent cognitive abilities at a very early age and was able to read and write by the age of two. At the age of seven, Professor Elena Achkovska-Leshkovska from the Institute of Psychology tested Marko. Her findings showed that his brain operated much higher than other children his age. She also found that he had very high emotional and social cognitive abilities, which is something not usually found in gifted kids such as Marko.

Family
His mother Radica ćalasan and father Milan Ćalasan run a computer school for children. They also plan to write a book on how to teach young children about computers. This will all be based on Marko's progress in computers as a child.

Microsoft and Cisco certificates

 MCP – Microsoft Certified Professional
 MCDST- Microsoft Certified Desktop Support Technician
 MCSA – Microsoft Certified Systems Administrator
 MCSE – Microsoft Certified Systems Engineer Server 2003
 MCTS - Windows 7, Configuring - Microsoft Certified Technology Specialist Server 2008 Active Directory
 MCS Associate Windows Server 2008
 MCITP - Server Administrator on Windows Server 2008
 MCITP - Enterprise Administrator on Windows Server 2008
 MCTS - Technology Specialist Windows Server 2008 Active Directory
 MCTS - Technology Specialist Windows Server 2008 Application  Infrastructure Configuration
 MCTS - Technology Specialist Windows Server 2008 Network Infrastructure Configuration
 MCTS - Technology Specialist Windows7 Configuration
 CCENT - Cisco Certified Entry Network Technician
 ССП - Microsoft Bakery High School

References

2000 births
Living people
Scientists from Skopje
Macedonian people of Montenegrin descent